La donna gravida (or simply La gravida; Italian for "The Pregnant Woman") is an oil on wood portrait by the Italian High Renaissance artist Raphael. It was painted between 1505 and 1506, during Raphael's stay in Florence, Italy. It is now in the Palazzo Pitti in Florence.

The portrait depicts a woman who is pregnant sitting with her left hand resting on her stomach. Paintings of pregnant women were unusual in the Renaissance period.

History
The work is mentioned for the first time in an early 18th-century inventory of Palazzo Pitti, as from an unknown artist. In 1813 it was transferred to the Grand Ducal wardrobe of the Uffizi, before returning again to Palazzo Pitti where it should replace several works  robbed by the French. In the 1815 inventory it is attributed to   Innocenzo da Imola, while in that of 1829 it is again listed as by an unknown painter.   It was first ascribed to Raphael in 1839: it is now nearly unanimously considered by the Umbrian painter, with the exception of Italian 19th century  art historian Giovanni Battista Cavalcaselle, who assigned it to Ridolfo del Ghirlandaio.

The identification of the portrayed woman is disputed.  She could be a member of the Bufalini family of   Città di Castello, or  Emilia Pia da Montefeltro, due to similarities with the Portrait of Emilia Pia da Montefeltro, now at Baltimore Museum of Art in the United States.

See also
List of paintings by Raphael

References
Page at the Web Gallery of Art.  Retrieved April 16, 2007.

External links

16th-century portraits
Portraits by Raphael
Paintings in the collection of the Galleria Palatina
1506 paintings
Portraits of women
Pregnancy in art